Miasteczko  is a village in the administrative district of Gmina Skaryszew, within Radom County, Masovian Voivodeship, in east-central Poland. The word miasteczko is a diminutive of the Polish word miasto ("town"), and means "small town" or "village".

References

Miasteczko